Badr Bilal (born 4 November 1962) is a Qatari former striker who played for Al Sadd He is currently a sports analyst.

He was part of the Qatar U–20 team which came runners-up in the 1981 FIFA Youth World Cup. He scored 3 goals in 6 matches.

He had played for Al Sadd's first team since 1979, but only became a key player in 1982 after he scored a crucial goal in the Emir Cup final that year while filling in for an injured Ali Behzad. He went on to win 23 official football championships with Al Sadd.

References

External links
Stats

Qatar international footballers
1962 births
Living people
Al Sadd SC players
Qatar Stars League players
Qatari footballers
Association football forwards